The Nottinghamshire Football Association, often known simply as the Notts FA, is the governing body of football in the county of Nottinghamshire, England. The Nottinghamshire FA runs a number of cups at different levels for teams across most of Nottinghamshire, as well as educating their affiliated clubs and members with relevant courses and events.  A small number of clubs in the north of the county are members of the Sheffield and Hallamshire County Football Association.

County cups

Nottinghamshire Senior Cup finals

●1883–84 Nottingham Forest 5–0 Notts Trent *replay (Castle Cricket Ground)

●1884–85 Notts County

●1885–86 Nottingham Forest 1–0 Nottingham Rangers (Castle Cricket Ground)

●1886–87 Nottingham Forest 3–0 Notts Olympic (Gregory Ground)

●1887–88 Notts Rangers 4–2 Ruddington

●1888–89 Notts Rangers 7–0 Ruddington

●1889–90 Beeston 3–1 Newark (Castle Ground)

●1890–91 Nottingham Forest 2–1 Ruddington (Town Ground)

●1891–92 Greenhalghs 3–1 Wilkinsons (Town Ground)

●1892–93 Greenhalghs 2–1 Notts Olympic (Hucknall)

●1893–94 Bulwell United 1–0 Newstead Byron (Hucknall)

●1894–95 Newark 2–0 Notts County (Bulwell)

●1895–96 Nottingham Forest (Bulwell)

●1896–97 Nottingham Forest

●1897–98 Hucknall St Johns bt Kimberley (Bulwell)

●1898–99 Nottingham Forest bt Newark (City Ground)

●1899–1900 Notts County bt Sutton Town *replay (City Ground)

●1900–01 Notts County bt Newark (Cinderhill Road)

●1901–02 Nottingham Forest bt Notts County *replay (City Ground)

●1902–03 Notts County 2–0 Arnold *replay (City Ground)

●1903–04 Newark 2–0 Arnold (City Ground)

●1904–05 Nottingham Forest 2–0 Newark (City Ground)

●1905–06 Newark 2–0 Nottingham Forest (City Ground)

●1906–07 Nottingham Forest 4–1 Notts Magdala (City Ground)

●1907–08 Nottingham Forest bt Notts County Reserves *replay (Notts Olympic)

●1908–09 Sutton Town bt Stanton Hill Victoria (Mansfield Mechanics)

●1909–10 Nottingham Forest 3–0 Eastwood Rangers (Stanhope Street)

●1910–11 Notts County 1–0 Sutton Junction (City Ground)

●1911–12 Notts County 8–2 Stanton Hill Victoria (Westfield Lane)

●1912–13 Sutton Town 2–1 Sutton Junction (Field Mill)

●1913–14 Sutton Town 3–1 Sutton Junction (Field Mill)

●1914–15 Sutton Junction 1–0 Mansfield Mchanics (Sutton Town)

●1915–16 No competition due to World War I

●1916–17 No competition due to World War I

●1917–18 No competition due to World War I

●1918–19 No competition due to World War I

●1919–20 Nottingham Forest bt Hucknall Colliery *replay (Field Mill)

●1920–21 Nottingham Forest 2–1 Mansfield Town *replay (Meadow Lane)

●1921–22 Welbeck Colliery 4–2 Nottingham Forest (Field Mill)

●1922–23 Mansfield Town 2–1 Newark Athletic (Sutton Town)

●1923–24 Sutton Town 1–0 Newark Town (City Ground)

●1924–25 Notts County 1–0 Nottingham Forest (Field Mill)

●1925–26 Mansfield Town 6–0 Players Athletic (Sutton Town)

●1926–27 Mansfield Town 5–1 Notts County (Sutton Town)

●1927–28 Nottingham Forest 2–1 Notts County (Field Mill)

●1928–29 Notts County 4–2 Nottingham Forest (Field Mill)

●1929–30 Nottingham Forest 4–0 Newark Town (Meadow Lane)

●1930–31 Mansfield Town 7–0 Notts County (Field Mill)

●1931–32 Mansfield Town 1–0 Nottingham Forest (Field Mill)

●1932–33 Nottingham Forest 3–2 Newark Town (Ransome & Marles)

●1933–34 Notts County 4–3 Nottingham Forest (Field Mill)

●1934–35 Notts County 3–2 Nottingham Forest (Meadow Lane)

●1935–36 Notts County 5–2 Newark Town *aet (Newark Town)

●1936–37 Raleigh Athletic 3–0 Ollerton Colliery (Meadow Lane)

●1937–38 Ollerton Colliery 4–1 Ransome & Marles (Newark Town)

●1938–39 Players Athletic 4–3 Ollerton Colliery *aet (Newark Town)

●1939–40 No competition due to World War II

●1940–41 No competition due to World War II

●1941–42 No competition due to World War II

●1942–43 No competition due to World War II

●1943–44 No competition due to World War II

●1944–45 No competition due to World War II

●1945–46 Bestwood Colliery 1–0 Gedling Colliery *aet (Meadow Lane)

●1946–47 Basford United 4–2 Gedling Colliery (Meadow Lane)

●1947–48 Ransome & Marles bt Gedling Colliery (Meadow Lane)

●1948–49 Retford Town 3–1 Ollerton Colliery (Meadow Lane)

●1949–50 Linby Colliery 1–0 Retford Town (City Ground)

●1950–51 Retford Town 4–0 Linby Colliery

●1951–52 Linby Colliery bt Retford Town *replay (Meadow Lane)

●1952–53 Gedling Colliery 4–0 Sutton Town (Meadow Lane)

●1953–54 Linby Colliery

●1954–55 Retford Town

●1955–56 Sutton Town

●1956–57 Ransome & Marles bt Sutton Town

●1957–58 Sutton Town

●1958–59 Retford Town 3–1 Arnold St Marys *replay (Meadow Lane)

●1959–60 Sutton Town

●1960–61 Arnold St Marys

●1961–62 Sutton Town

●1962–63 Sutton Town

●1963–64 Sutton Town

●1964–65 Arnold

●1965–66 Arnold

●1966–67 Retford Town

●1967–68 Sutton Town

●1968–69 Arnold

●1969–70 Sutton Town

●1970–71 Arnold

●1971–72 Sutton Town

●1972–73 Sutton Town

●1973–74 Sutton Town

●1974–75 Sutton Town

●1975–76 Eastwood Town

●1976–77 Sutton Town

●1977–78 Eastwood Town

●1978–79 Eastwood Town

●1979–80 Eastwood Town

●1980–81 Rainworth Miners Welfare

●1981–82 Rainworth Miners Welfare

●1982–83 Eastwood Town 5–2 Rainworth Miners Welfare (Gedling Road)

●1983–84 Eastwood Town 6–1 Hucknall Colliery Welfare (Gedling Road)

●1984–85 Hucknall Colliery Welfare 2–0 Arnold (Coronation Park)

●1985–86 Clipstone Welfare

●1986–87 Huthwaite 1–0 Rainworth Miners Welfare

●1987–88 Basford United

●1988–89 Eastwood Town 3–0 Southwell City

●1989–90 Eastwood Town

●1990–91 Hucknall Town 3–0 Clipstone Welfare

●1991–92 Eastwood Town 2–0 Nottinghamshire Police

●1992–93 Arnold Town 3–1 Rainworth Miners Welfare (Coronation Park)

●1993–94 Clipstone Welfare 3–2 Boots Athletic (Field Mill)

●1994–95 Oakham United 3–0 Clipstone Welfare

●1995–96 Arnold Town 2–0 Boots Athletic

●1996–97 Arnold Town 1–0 Boots Athletic (Field Mill)

●1997–98 Hucknall Town 2–1 Pelican

●1998–99 Arnold Town 2–1 Hucknall Town

●1999–2000 Hucknall Town 2–1 Eastwood Town

●2000–01 Hucknall Town 1–0 Gedling Town

●2001–02 Gedling Town 1–0 Southwell City (Meadow Lane)

●2002–03 Hucknall Town 2–0 Teversal

●2003–04 Eastwood Town 2–0 Hucknall Town

●2004–05 Arnold Town 1–0 Eastwood Town

●2005–06 Eastwood Town 3–1 Sutton Town

●2006–07 Eastwood Town 0–0 Arnold Town *pens

●2007–08 Eastwood Town 2–0 Ollerton Town

●2008–09 Retford United 2–1 Eastwood Town

●2009–10 Eastwood Town 4–3 Retford United 3 *aet (Meadow Lane)

●2010–11 Eastwood Town 6–1 Carlton Town (Field Mill)

●2011–12 Eastwood Town

●2012–13 Carlton Town 5–2 Sutton Town (Coronation Park)

●2013–14 Carlton Town 6–2 Rainworth Miners Welfare (Watnall Road)

●2014–15 Basford United 5–3 Clipstone Welfare (Field Mill)

●2015–16 Basford United 2–2 Clipstone Welfare *pens (Coronation Park)

●2016–17 Carlton Town 4–1 Basford United (Meadow Lane)

●2017–18 Basford United 5–1 Dunkirk (Coronation Park)

●2018–19 Basford United 3–0 Carlton Town (Field Mill)

●2019–20 No competition due to COVID-19

●2020–21 No competition due to COVID-19

●2021–22 Carlton Town 1–0 Mansfield Town U23 (Greenwich Avenue)

Number Of Titles

External links

County football associations
Football in Nottinghamshire